Radzyń may refer to :

 Radzyń Chełmiński, a town in the Kuyavian-Pomeranian Voivodship, Poland
 Radzyń Podlaski, a town in the Lublin Voivodship, Poland
Radzyń, Łódź Voivodeship, a village in central Poland
Radzyń, Lubusz Voivodeship, a village in western Poland
Lords of Radzyn Keep, characters in Melanie Rawn's fantasy novels of the Dragon Prince series including Chay, Tobin, Maarken, etc.